Felipe Garcia may refer to:

People
 Felipe García (handballer) (born 1993), Chilean handball player
 Felipe Garcia (footballer, born 1988), Brazilian goalkeeper soccer player
 Felipe Garcia (footballer, born 1990), Brazilian midfielder soccer player
 Felipe Arturo Camarena Garcia (born 1956), Mexican politician
 Felipe Fernández García (1935–2012), Mexican-born Roman Catholic bishop
 Felipe Navarro García (1930–1994, nicknamed "Yale") Spanish journalist
 Felipe Tejeda García (1935–2018), Mexican-born Roman Catholic bishop
 Andrés Felipe Ibargüen García (born 1992), Colombian soccer player

Fictional characters
 Felipe "Cobra" García, a superpowered teen on the Mexican TV show Los elegidos (TV series)

Other uses
 Felipe Garcia Store, Ponce, Puerto Rico, a building that housed the Ponce Historical Archive from 1995 to 2013
 Felipe Orlando García-Murciano Collection of Pre-Columbian art, housed at the Benalmádena Museum, Málaga, Spain

See also

 García Felipe de Legazpi y Velasco Altamirano y Albornoz, (1643–1706) Roman Catholic bishop
 
 
 Felipe (disambiguation)
 Garcia (disambiguation)